The Hermitage Point Trail is a hiking trail in Grand Teton National Park in the U.S. state of Wyoming. The trailhead is at the Colter Bay Village parking area and provides a loop totalling  to Hermitage Point and back along the shores of Jackson Lake. The trail passes by several wetland areas as well as Heron Pond and Swan Lake. There are no camping areas on the trail.

See also
List of hiking trails in Grand Teton National Park

References

Hiking trails of Grand Teton National Park